The Triplicane Urban Cooperative Society (TUCS) was started on 1904 in Triplicane, a neighbourhood of Chennai. It was the first consumer cooperative society in India. As of 2004, the society owned  40 buildings including  8000 Sq. ft. of departmental stores and storage space in Anna Salai.

References

Retailing in Chennai